Marta Onofre (born 28 January 1991) is a Portuguese pole vaulter. She competed at the 2016 IAAF World Indoor Championships. Her personal bests in the event are 4.40 metres outdoors (Taipei 2017) and 4.51 metres indoors (Pombal 2016). The latter is the current national record.

Competition record

References

External links

4

1991 births
Living people
Portuguese female pole vaulters
Place of birth missing (living people)
Athletes (track and field) at the 2016 Summer Olympics
Olympic athletes of Portugal
Universiade medalists in athletics (track and field)
Athletes (track and field) at the 2018 Mediterranean Games
Universiade bronze medalists for Portugal
Competitors at the 2015 Summer Universiade
Medalists at the 2017 Summer Universiade
Mediterranean Games competitors for Portugal